August Lass (16 August 1903 – 27 November 1962) was an Estonian footballer.

Career
Lass earned 21 caps for the Estonian national team between 1921 and 1928. He played  for JK Tallinna Kalev and Tallinna Jalgpalliklubi and participated at the 1924 Summer Olympics.

He became Estonian champion in 1923 with JK Tallinna Kalev, in 1926 and 1928 with Tallinna JK. He was arrested by the Soviet authorities in April 1941 and was deported to Siberia, he returned home in 1947, but in 1949-1955 he was deported again for unknown reasons.

Honours
JK Tallinna Kalev
 Estonian Top Division: 1923
Tallinna JK
 Estonian Top Division: 1926, 1928

References

External links
 
 
 

1903 births
1962 deaths
Footballers from Tallinn
People from the Governorate of Estonia
Estonian footballers
Estonia international footballers
Footballers at the 1924 Summer Olympics
Olympic footballers of Estonia
JK Tallinna Kalev players
Burials at Rahumäe Cemetery
Association football goalkeepers